Kinch v Bullard [1998] 4 All ER 650 is an English land law case, concerning co-ownership of land and an act of severance of a joint tenancy, whether caught by the deemed-delivered provisions of the common law postal rule.

Facts
Mr and Mrs Johnson, beneficial joint tenants (of the two forms of joint ownership the standard arrangement for spouses co-owning land), were divorcing. Mrs Johnson was terminally ill. Mrs. sent Mr. a letter by ordinary first-class post stating her intention to sever her interest. It was delivered, but before seeing it Mr. suffered a heart attack. Mrs. realised she was likely to outlive him, survivorship would then operate passing the property to her completely, so she destroyed the letter. He (indeed) died a few weeks later and she died a few months later.

His executors, consulting with the beneficiaries, chose to sue her executors to decide whether the notice severed the form of ownership (if so, then his last Will and Testament would chiefly determine the fate of his 50% stake in the property as long as it made adequate provision for all dependants under the relevant family/dependency Act of 1975). If not, the Will could have no effect on the death estate; the property would become hers absolutely, subject to any dependency of his or clear unreasonableness.

The law was unclear.

Judgment
Neuberger J held that the notice was effective. He did not take counsel’s argument for her estate that because Mrs. no longer, at that time, ‘desires to sever the joint tenancy’, the statutory precondition for valid notice was not there under section 36(2) (of the Law of Property Act 1925). This, he held, was wrong because the function of section 36(2) was not to bring the court to enquire into the parties’ state of mind. He said:

Obiter dictum
But, explained Neuberger J, it would probably be otherwise if a withdrawal was communicated before a notice was given (or deemed given), applying Holwell Securities Ltd v Hughes. This was just, however, ‘no more than a tentative view' — an obiter dictum (other words and side-opinions of the court).

Cases considered
Binding precedents
Lord Newborough v Jones [1975] EWCA

See also

English trusts law
English land law
English property law

References and notes
References

Notes

1998 in England
1998 in case law
English trusts case law
English land case law
1998 in British law
High Court of Justice cases